SS Badger is a passenger and vehicle ferry in the United States that has been in service on Lake Michigan since 1953. It is the last coal-fired passenger vessel operating on the Great Lakes, and was designated a National Historic Landmark on January 20, 2016.

The ship is named after the University of Wisconsin's athletic teams, the Wisconsin Badgers. Badger runs on Michigan time (Eastern Time Zone, whereas Wisconsin is in the Central Time Zone) and riders pay Michigan taxes on their fares. It runs on a seasonal basis from May to October.

History 
Badger was constructed as a rail car ferry in 1952 by the Christy Corporation of Sturgeon Bay, Wisconsin, along with its twin   (named after the mascot of Michigan State University) with a reinforced hull for ice-breaking. It was originally used to carry railroad cars, passengers and automobiles between the two sides of the lake all year long. Today, the ferry connects the eastern and western segments of US 10 in the two cities from May to October.

Launched September 6, 1952, SS Badger entered service March 21, 1953, for the Chesapeake and Ohio Railway (from 1973 a subsidiary of the Chessie System). The C&O had acquired the rail car ferry operations in Ludington with its acquisition of the Pere Marquette Railway in 1947. After 1972, service was gradually curtailed; all but the three newest vessels were retired, and sailings to Milwaukee, Wisconsin, and Manitowoc, Wisconsin, were discontinued, leaving only the route between Ludington and Kewaunee, Wisconsin. On July 1, 1983, the Chessie System ended its car ferry service when it sold the steamers Badger, Spartan, and City of Midland 41 to Glen F. Bowden of Ludington. He organized the Michigan–Wisconsin Transportation Company (MWT) to continue the operation.

The railroad car ferry concept on Lake Michigan was facing serious economic troubles during the 1980s and by November 1988, Badger was the only vessel running. It was the last of the 14 ferries based in Ludington remaining in service. On November 16, 1990, facing bankruptcy, Bowden laid up Badger, ending 93 years of railway car ferry service out of Ludington and 98 years on Lake Michigan as a whole.

Lake Michigan Carferry Service 

After sitting idle for a year, the three ferries were purchased by entrepreneur, philanthropist, and Ludington native Charles F. Conrad of Holland, Michigan, on July 9, 1991. He undertook a major overhaul and refit of Badger exclusively for carrying passengers and automobiles. The only operating ferry of its kind in the world, the ship is an icon of car ferry heritage on the Great Lakes. Conrad retired as president of Lake Michigan Carferry Service in 1993. He died on February 9, 1995. Since 1993, the company has been headed by his son-in-law, Robert Manglitz.

Badger is the last large coal-burning steamship in the United States and is the last vessel in service on the Great Lakes to be powered by Skinner Unaflow engines (manufactured by the Skinner Company of Erie, Pennsylvania).

Typically, Badger completes a trip across Lake Michigan in about four hours, covering . SS Badger rarely misses a sailing due to weather.

SS Badger is also unusual in that it is a registered historical site in two states. The Michigan Historical Commission and the Wisconsin Historical commission each named Badger as a registered historical site in 1997. In 1996, Badger propulsion system was designated a mechanical engineering landmark by the American Society of Mechanical Engineers. In 2002, Badger was named Ship of the Year by the Steamship Historical Society of America. The ship was listed on the National Register of Historic Places on December 11, 2009. On January 20, 2016, the National Park Service designated the ship a National Historic Landmark.

On August 9, 2008, Badger suffered a stern bearing failure, causing the company to cancel the ferry's sailings for nearly a week. It was the first time the ship had ever experienced a stern bearing failure. On August 10, the ferry sailed under its own power to the Bay Shipbuilding yard in Sturgeon Bay, Wisconsin, for repairs. As the yard had no opening at the time for the work to be done in the dry dock, a team of divers was flown in from California to assist in the repairs. Regular sailings resumed August 15, 2008. It was the first time since 1993 (when it struck a rock at Ludington) that Badger was laid up for unscheduled repairs and the first time since 2005 that the company cancelled a sailing because of mechanical failure. 

Badger large deck space allows it to transport tractor trailers and larger commercial loads. In 2012, it carried more than 1,000 commercial loads. Badger fall season was extended two weeks into early November to carry additional wind turbine loads. In 2015, the ferry was officially designated as part of US 10, thus linking the two disconnected segments of the highway.

In December 2020, the Badger was sold to Interlake Steamship Company. The deal also includes the barge Pere Marquette 41 and the SS Spartan. It was a part of a larger sale of assets. Interlake is based in Middleburg Heights, Ohio.

Environmental impact 

SS Badger came under fire from the Environmental Protection Agency (EPA) and environmental groups in late 2008 because of its daily practice of dumping untreated coal ash from its boilers directly into the waters of Lake Michigan. Burning  of coal a day produces  of ash. Coal ash is a byproduct of Badger propulsion system.

Badger had earlier been the subject of EPA Clean Air action, but was granted an exemption under the law due to its historical significance as a coal-fired, steam-powered vessel. Company officials compared coal ash to "harmless sand" and planned to keep Badger in its original coal-burning configuration.  In an effort to continue to minimize the environmental impact to the lake, the Lake Michigan Carferry had explored a number of alternatives, including storing the ash on board and unloading upon arrival in Ludington. Another option once considered was the use of compressed natural gas, which would allow the historical boiler system to be maintained and make SS Badger the first "green" ship on the Great Lakes.

Lake Michigan Carferry signed a consent decree with the United States Department of Justice and the EPA in March 2013 to end ash discharge within two years, using a new ash-retention system. The revised consent decree was filed in September 2013. In January 2015, work began on a conveyor system that will store ash in four containment bins on board. A new combustion-control system will allow the ship to be more efficient by burning less coal and generating less ash. Badger was retrofitted so that it will no longer discharge ash into the lake, and has been certified to return to service.  The ash is now off-loaded and used to make cement.

See also 

 U.S. Highway 10
 In Michigan
 In Wisconsin
Ferries in Michigan
 HSC Lake Express

Notes

References

Further reading

External links 

 
Badger Ferry  Video produced by Wisconsin Public Television
Skinner Compound Unaflow Engine
 S.S. BADGER ENGINES AND BOILERS 12 pages

Ferries of Michigan
Ferries of Wisconsin
Transportation in Manitowoc County, Wisconsin
Ships on the National Register of Historic Places in Michigan
Michigan State Historic Sites
Steamships of the United States
Transportation in Mason County, Michigan
U.S. Route 10
1952 ships
Ships built in Milwaukee
Lake Michigan Circle Tour
Ferries of the United States Numbered Highway System
Great Lakes ships
National Historic Landmarks in Michigan
National Register of Historic Places in Mason County, Michigan
Chesapeake and Ohio Railway Car Ferries
Passenger ships of the Great Lakes